Corop is a town in the Goulburn Valley region of Victoria, Australia.

Near the town are Lake Cooper and Greens Lake, both popular venues for aquatic activities. The town is home to as many holiday homes as permanent dwellings and the town is much larger in holiday times.

Corop Post Office opened on 1 January 1868.

References

External links

Towns in Victoria (Australia)